Deadly Women is an American true-life crime documentary-style television series that first aired in 2005 on the Discovery Channel, focusing on female killers. It was originally based on a 52- minute-long TV documentary film called "Poisonous Women," which was released in 2003. Two years after, in 2005, it inspired a mini-series consisting of three episodes: "Obsession," "Greed" and "Revenge." After a three-year hiatus, the show resumed production in 2008 and began airing on the Investigation Discovery channel as a regularly scheduled series. The series is produced in Australia by Beyond International.

Series overview

Episodes

Pilot (2003)
The 52 minutes long TV film which was the basic pilot to the show covered 4 cases of women throughout history who committed murders by poison. The TV film was narrated by Marsha Crenshaw.

Season 1 (2005)
Each of the three original episodes covered the cases of various groups of men who were united by the central theme of the episode. These three episodes of the show were narrated by Marsha Crenshaw.

Season 2 (2008–09)
Deadly Women resumed production of Season 2 in 2008, with slight changes. A new narrator was introduced, Lynnanne Zager, and each episode was reduced to featuring three cases instead of four.

Season 3 (2009–10)

Season 4 (2010)

Season 5 (2011–12)

Season 6 (2012–13)

Season 7 (2013)

Season 8 (2014)

Season 9 (2015)

Season 10 (2016)

Season 11 (2017)

Season 12 (2018)

Season 13 (2019)

Season 14 (2021)

References

External links
 
 
 

Lists of American non-fiction television series episodes
Lists of Australian non-fiction television series episodes
Women-related lists